Numa Pompilio Llona (March 5, 1832 – April 5, 1907) was an Ecuadorian poet, journalist, educator, diplomat, and philosopher.

Numa Pompilio Llona was widely read in his time, but today he is mostly forgotten.

Biography

His father was the Ecuadorian lawyer Dr. Manuel Leocadio de Llona y Rivera, and his mother was Mercedes Echeverri Llados from Colombia. Born in Guayaquil, Numa Pompilio Llona completed primary school in Cali, Colombia, and completed secondary school in Lima, Peru. He received a law degree at the Universidad San Marcos in Lima, Peru.

Career
From 1854 to 1859, Numa Pompilo Llona was the literary editor of the Peruvian newspaper El Comercio. In 1882 he was appointed the rector of the University of Guayaquil, where he held the professorship of aesthetics and general literature. He also served as a diplomat in Spain (1860–62), France, Italy (1864), and Colombia (1884), and formed friendships with many famous poets and writers of the time, such as Victor Hugo, George Sand, Alphonse de Lamartine, Cienfuegos Manzini, Núñez de Arce, Leopard and others. He was also the director of the Municipal Museum and Library of Guayaquil (1904 to 1907).

Marriage
Numa Pompilio Llona was married to Enriqueta Marchena y Bentín, and after her death, married the Peruvian poet and journalist Lastenia Larriva.

Death
Numa Pompilio Llona died on April 5, 1907.
His remains are interred in crypt # 705-C in the Cementerio General of Guayaquil.

Legacy

One of Guayaquil’s most popular tourist attractions, the neighborhood Las Peñas has a street named after Numa Pompilio Llona. Many of this street’s 400-year-old houses have been converted into art galleries and several notable artists have studios there. There are also schools in Ecuador named after Numa Pompilio Llona.

Literary works
 Cien sonetos (1847)
 Cien sonetos nuevos (1880)
 Interrogaciones
 Amor supremo
 Himnos, dianas y elegías patrióticas y religiosas
 De la penumbra a la Luz
 Cantos americanos (1866)
 Nuevas poesías
 Artículos en rosa
 Noches de dolor en las montañas (1872)
 Cantos patrióticos y religiosos (1881)
 Canto a la vida
 La odisea del alma (1876)
 Clamores de Occidente
 Poemas amatorios y diversos (1882)
 El gran enigma
 Noche de dolor en las montañas
 Grandeza moral
 La bandera del ecuador
 La estela de una vida (1893)
 Los caballeros del Apocalipsis (1869)

References

Ecuadorian poets
1832 births
1907 deaths
People from Guayaquil
National University of San Marcos alumni
Academic staff of the University of Guayaquil
19th-century poets
Ecuadorian diplomats